The Thaayorre, or Kuuk Thaayore, are an Australian people living on the southwestern part of the Cape York Peninsula, Queensland in Australia, primarily in the settlement Pormpuraaw, having its foundation in the Edward River Mission.

Language
Kuuk Thaayorre belongs to the Paman language group though its specific genetic affiliation has not been established beyond question. Barry Alpher regards it as part of the Pama-Maric group. It shows considerable lexical exchange with Yir-Yiront and Kugu Nganhcara. Many of the 300 native speakers are multilingual, with competence, not only in the above two languages, but also in Pakanha, Uw Olkola and Wik Mungkan. It has the rare feature among Australian aboriginal languages of having numerous monosyllables in all word classes and in possessing, compared to these languages, a comparatively rich inventory of 5 vowels.

Country
Their tribal neighbours were the Yir-Yiront to the south, and the Kugu Nganhcara to their north.

Time and space
Normatively, the representation of time in all world cultures has been thought to be organized in relative spatial terms, with one's body as cardinal pivot for the direction of time's flow: from right to left/back to front, or vice versa in each case. According to Alice Gaby, the speakers of Thaayorre have a distinctive system, inscribed in the grammar of their language, whereby the cardinal points are a spatial absolute, determining time as shifting in an east-to-west orientation. Thus, if the speaker stands facing south, time is expressed as flowing from left to right, and, conversely, if one is looking north, time flows from right to left. If the speaker is facing east, time flows towards the body. If west, then time is envisaged as moving away from the subject.

History
The Thaayorre were drawn from their lands in the south-east to the Edward River Mission, which was on their territory, by the ready availability of things like tobacco, sugar, and particularly steel axes. They assigned these things as possessions of the 'ghost-clan', meaning that they originated with white people. The Thaayorre now divide their time between Pormpuraaw and outstations in their homeland where they can live a more traditional lifestyle.

Alternative names
 Taiol.(Gilbert River pronunciation)
 Tayore
 Koko-Taiyor
 Da:jor
 Koko-Daiyuri
 Kokkotaijari
 Kokotaiyari
 Koko-yak
 Gugujak
 Daiyuri

Notes

Citations

Sources

Aboriginal peoples of Queensland
Australian Aboriginal culture
Far North Queensland